Norman R. Ericson (July 21, 1932 – December 22, 2011) was an American teacher and Bible scholar.

Early life and education
Ericson was born on July 21, 1932, in Loomis, Nebraska, United States to Raymond and Myrtle Ericson.

He had his early education in Holdrege, Nebraska after his family moved there. In 1950, he attended Trinity Seminary and Bible College (now Trinity International University) in Deerfield, Illinois for two years. He was the choir president in his second year. Ericson then transferred the University of Nebraska to finish his BA degree.

He married Ruth Peterson from Minnesota in 1954 at the First Evangelical Free Church in Chicago. Peterson and Ericson first met in Trinity International University. He also took up Bachelor of Divinity from Trinity Evangelical Divinity School where he graduated on May 31, 1957. He also previously took an Associate of Arts degree in the same school from 1950 until he graduated in 1952.

Career
Ericson began teaching Biblical and Hellenic studies at what was then Trinity College in Deerfield, Illinois in 1957. He was appointed as a professor at Trinity Evangelical Divinity School where he became a full-time faculty of the said institution in September 1974. He was a popular instructor among his students as he effectively communicated with them at all levels of the academic experience. He also gave each of his students one a sense of being his principal focus. While almost all the courses he taught were relating to New Testament Studies, he also enjoyed teaching ancient Hellenic and Old Testament courses. One of his significant contributions he made in the scholarship of Biblical studies was his work on the interpretation of the Old Testament in the New Testament. This area of interest goes back to his work on his doctoral thesis in Biblical Studies at the University of Chicago. His presentation at the Evangelical Theological Society on the topic was an important contribution. He also concentrated his scholarship on the Petrine epistles of the New Testament, 1st Peter, 2nd Peter, and Jude. Additionally, he was known for his teaching of the Gospel of John and the books of James and Hebrews in the New Testament. While an evangelical theologically, he also taught the importance of knowing and engaging scholarship from New Testament criticism.

Ericson was a professor at Wheaton College in Wheaton, Illinois. He started there in 1977 as a Professor of New Testament Studies. He then later served as the chair of the Department of Bible, Theology, and Archeology. He also served as a senior translator and consulting editor of New Living Translation Study Bible, which aides people in enhancing the study of the bible through study experience with maps, a word study system, recommendations for further reading, visual aids, and profiles of bible characters. He also taught New Testament and Greek courses at Wheaton College and its Graduate School.

He also served as adjunct professor at Northern Baptist Theological Seminary in Lombard, Illinois. One of his most influential articles, entitled "The NT Use of the OT: A Kerygmatic Approach," was presented at the Evangelical Theological Society.

Ericson retired from teaching in 2000, concluding 43 years in his chosen profession.

Bible translator

Ericson provided the analysis of the Theology of the New Testament books of 1st Peter, 2nd Peter, and Jude for the Evangelical Dictionary of Biblical Theology and other topical articles in that publication. He was the general reviewer and senior translator of the Letters and Revelation books of the New Testament in the New Living Translation of the Bible. He was also one of the translators of Hebrews, James, 1st and 2nd Peter, and Jude in that translation for the Evangelical Dictionary of Biblical Theology. As of March 2013, the New Living Translation of the Bible is the third most popular English version of the Bible based on unit sales according to the Christian Booksellers Association.

Recognition
Ericson was named as a Professor Emeritus at Wheaton College in Wheaton, Illinois. A yearbook was also dedicated to him at Trinity International University. The yearbook dedication was, "This book is dedicated to a man who has abandoned what we humans would consider his rightful claim to superiority; who takes his fellow immortals seriously and whose play is of the merriest kind."

Death
Ericson died on December 22, 2011, at Johnson Health Care Center in Carol Stream, Illinois.

Works

Thesis

Books
Ericson also wrote numerous books, mostly scholarly books, relating to his field in theology, and Bible studies.

Articles
He also authored several articles for numerous theology journals, one was from the Journal of the Evangelical Theological Society. Ericson continues to be cited in books on Biblical studies, hermeneutics and leadership.

References

1932 births
2011 deaths
American people of Swedish descent
American biblical scholars
University of Chicago Divinity School alumni
University of Nebraska alumni
Trinity International University alumni
Trinity Evangelical Divinity School alumni
Wheaton College (Illinois) faculty
New Testament scholars
People from Phelps County, Nebraska
Translators of the Bible into English
20th-century translators
People from Holdrege, Nebraska